Annachlamys is a genus of scallops, marine bivalve molluscs in the family Pectinidae.

Species
The World Register of Marine Species lists the following species:
 Annachlamys flabellata (Lamarck, 1819)
 Annachlamys iredalei (Powell, 1958)
 Annachlamys kuhnholtzi (Bernardi, 1860)
 Annachlamys leopardu Iredale, 1939
 Annachlamys reevei (Adams in Adams & Reeve, 1850)
 Annachlamys striatula (Linnaeus, 1758)

References

Pectinidae
Bivalve genera